A list of books and essays about Georges Méliès:

Melies
Georges Méliès